was a Japanese jurist. He was a prominent representative of post-war liberalism in Japan and the country's leading legal sociologist.

Serving as  Sakae Wagatsuma's assistant after 1932, Kawashima was appointed professor of civil law at the University of Tokyo in 1934. In his writings, he sought to develop a system of modern, Western, capitalist society based on the principle of the exchange of goods, which he contrasted to Japanese society with its remaining pre-modern and feudalist elements.

As a collaborator on the post-war reform of Japanese family law, Kawashima was unable to realize his ambitious ideas, but served as a counterweight to conservatives including Eiichi Makino.

In his 1963 article "Dispute Resolution in Contemporary Japan", he argued that although litigation is not a preferred method of dispute resolution anywhere, the Japanese have a particular cultural aversion to litigation. The article has sparked heated debate, generating various perspectives, notably John Haley's "The Myth of the Reluctant Litigant" and Mark Ramseyer's "Reluctant Litigant Revisited".

References

 

1909 births
1992 deaths
Academic staff of the University of Tokyo
Japanese jurists